Hockey Queensland is the governing body for the sport of hockey in Queensland, Australia. It is responsible for the administration of intrastate competitions, state representative teams, officials and the financial position of the sport. It's located in the Queensland State Hockey Centre in Colmslie, a suburb south of Brisbane.

History
On 11 November 1995, the Queensland Women's Hockey Association merged with Queensland Men's Hockey Association ending 75 years of independent operation and created Hockey Queensland. The combined Hockey Queensland structure boasts gender equity as well as increased and maintained funding levels to men's and women's programs. Hockey Queensland helped field hockey become an inaugural sport with the Queensland Academy of Sport (QAS) and the Northern University Games.

Associations

South East Queensland
Brisbane Hockey Association
Brisbane Women's Hockey Association
Gold Coast Hockey Association
Ipswich Hockey Association
Redlands Hockey Association
Sunshine Coast Hockey Association
Tweed Border Hockey Association
Toowoomba Hockey Association
Warwick Hockey Association

Wide Bay
Bundaberg Hockey Association
Gympie & Districts Hockey Association
Hervey Bay Hockey Association
Maryborough & Districts Hockey Association

Central Queensland
Gladstone & Districts Hockey Association
Mackay Hockey Association
Rockhampton Hockey Association
Moranbah Hockey Association

North Queensland
Atherton Hockey Association
Cairns Hockey Association
Mount Isa Hockey Association
Townsville Hockey Association

See also
Queensland Blades

References

External links
Official Website

Sports governing bodies in Queensland
Qu
Sports organizations established in 1995
1995 establishments in Australia